The 2017 Kentucky Christian Knights football team represented Kentucky Christian University in the 2017 NAIA football season. The Knights played their home games at KCU Field, in Grayson, Kentucky. Kentucky Christian competed in the Bluegrass Division of the Mid-South Conference. The team was led by first-year head coach Corey Fipps and finished 1–10 overall, 1–5 in conference play to finish sixth in the Bluegrass Division.

Schedule

References

Kentucky Christian
Kentucky Christian Knights football seasons
Kentucky Christian Knights football